is a Japanese manga artist. He is best known for his sci-fi series Alien Nine.

Career 
Tomizawa worked as an assistant to Baki the Grappler author Keisuke Itagaki, before publishing his first work as a professional manga artist with the series Uchū Jūbe in the magazine Shōnen Champion.

Style and themes 
His manga tend to be short, with sci-fi stories involving children and insects. His art was a fairly standard style for his first series, but starting with Alien 9 it became very distinctive, but with very large eyes and unnatural proportions, and has since been featured in exhibitions including Takashi Murakami's superflat.

Works 
 Treasure Hunter (肥前屋兵衛 Uchū Jūbe, serialized in Shōnen Champion, 1994-1995)
 Alien Nine (エイリアン9, serialized in Young Champion, 1998-1999)
 Milk Closet (ミルククローゼット, serialized in Afternoon, 2000-2001)
 Propeller Heaven (プロペラ天国 Propeller Tengoku, serialized in Ultra Jump, 2000-2001)
 Alien Nine Emulators (エイリアン9 エミュレイターズ, serialized in Champion Red, 2002)
 Radio Depart (ラジオデパート, one-shot in Afternoon Season Zōkan, 2002)
 Battle Royale II: Blitz Royale (BR2/ブリッツ・ロワイアル, serialized in Young Champion, 2003-2004, based on Koushun Takami)
 Tokumu Hōkōkan Yumihari (特務咆哮艦ユミハリ, serialized in Genzo, 2004-2007)
 Yume Nikki (ゆめにっき, serialized in Manga Life Win, 2013-2014)
Alien 9 Next (エイリアン9ネクスト, self-published, 2015-2016)

References

External links

FrogStarShip , Tomizawa's official website (Japanese).

Year of birth missing (living people)
Living people
Manga artists